The COVID-19 pandemic in the Pitcairn Islands - a British territory - is part of the ongoing worldwide pandemic of coronavirus disease 2019 caused by severe acute respiratory syndrome coronavirus 2. The virus was confirmed to have reached the islands on 16 July 2022.

Background
The Pitcairn Islands are a remote island chain in the Pacific consisting of the islands Pitcairn, Henderson, Ducie, and Oeno. They are the last British Overseas Territory in the Pacific. The islands have approximately 50 inhabitants.

On 12 January 2020, the World Health Organization (WHO) confirmed that a novel coronavirus was the cause of a respiratory illness in a cluster of people in Wuhan City, Hubei Province, China, which was reported to the WHO on 31 December 2019.

The case fatality ratio for COVID-19 has been much lower than SARS of 2003, but the transmission has been significantly greater, with a significant total death toll.

Timeline

2020
As a precautionary measure, the Pitcairn Islands Government closed the territories' borders. As a result, all passenger services to the Islands were suspended in mid-March 2020.

2021
The territory's entire population was vaccinated in May 2021, with vaccines that arrived via ship from New Zealand.  As of 28 February, 2022, 106 vaccines have been administered.

2022
In March 2022, the Pitcairn Islands reopened its border to international travel. Regular shipping with French Polynesia resumed on 5 July 2022.

On 16 July, the Pitcairn Islands reported its first case.

On 20 July, the Pitcairn Islands reported 3 cases, bringing the total number of cases to 4.

See also
 COVID-19 pandemic in Oceania

References

Pitcairn
Pitcairn
2020 in the Pitcairn Islands
2021 in the Pitcairn Islands
2022 in the Pitcairn Islands
Health in the Pitcairn Islands